Bayev is a surname. Notable people with the surname include:

Nikolai Bayev (1875–1952), Armenian architect
Denis Bayev (born 1983), Ukrainian hockey player
Khassan Baiev (born 1963), Chechen doctor and author
Pavel Baev (born 1957), Russian-Norwegian researcher